Veliki Park Hall, known locally as Hala Veliki Park is an indoor sporting arena located in Užice, Serbia. The seating capacity of the arena is for 2,200 spectators for sports events and 3,500 at concerts. 

It is currently home to the KK Sloboda basketball team and OK Jedinstvo volleyball team.

See also
List of indoor arenas in Serbia

External links
Venue information

Indoor arenas in Serbia
Basketball venues in Serbia
Sport in Užice